Ward No. 2 Dhaka North City Corporation is an administrative division of Dhaka North City Corporation in zone 1. It's located in Pallabi police station of Dhaka City. It forms a city corporation council electoral constituency and is a part of Bangladesh Jatiyo Sangshad constituency Dhaka-16.

Overview 
The ward covers Pallabi police station and Mirpur-12 in Dhaka. The boundaries of the ward are: Manikadi is in the east, Pallabi main road is in the west, Harirampur Union is in the north and Journalist plot is in the south.

Election highlights

References

External links 
 Official website

Wards of Dhaka North City Corporation